The Philippines national rugby union team, nicknamed the "Volcanoes", represents the Philippines in international rugby union. The Philippines have been playing in the Asia Rugby Championship since 2006 when the team was first created. In 2012 they won the Division I championship and were promoted to the top 5 for the 2013 tournament where they earned 4th place and again in the 2014 tournament. The Philippines have yet to make their debut at the Rugby World Cup.

In the March 19, 2012 World Rugby Rankings, Philippines, along with Mexico and Pakistan, were listed for the first time, entering with the base rating of 40 points (which positioned the three national teams in 71st place).

The national side is ranked 41st in the world (as of 29 July 2019).

History

In 1998 the Philippine Rugby Football Union (PRFU), the national governing body for rugby union in the Philippines, was formed. Rugby union in the Philippines was introduced mainly through the large number of British, Australian and New Zealand expatriates living in the country.

The Philippines made their first official international debut at the 5th division of the 2006 ARFU Asian Rugby Series. They won over Guam, 18 – 14, in its first match on May 20, 2006, but was later defeated by Pakistan in a match held on June 11, 2006, and failed to secure the sole slot for promotion to the next division.
In December 2006, the Philippines Under-19  went undefeated in the Asian Rugby Football Union (ARFU) Under-19 Second Division Tournament.

In 2008, the PRFU gained full membership to the international governing body, the International Rugby Board (IRB). The Philippines dominated the fourth-tier of the ARFU Asian 5 Nations Series and captured the inaugural Division 4 title. During the tournament, the Philippines demolished Brunei 101-0 and then defeated the home side Guam 20–8 to capture the division title.

In 2009 the Philippines won the inaugural Asian 5 Nations Division III rugby tournament at the Nomads field in Parañaque City. Defeating Iran 15-0 and Guam 25–0 in their two matches, the Philippines were then promoted to the Asian Five Nations Division II rugby tournament.

In 2010 the Philippines competed in the Asian 5 Nations Division II tournament and won it beating India in the final on a score of 44–12. Also in 2010 they played in ARFU Rugby 7s tournaments in Shanghai, Borneo and the Asian Games in Guangzhou.

In 2012 the Philippines competed in the Asian 5 Nations Division I tournament and went unbeaten in the round-robin series against Singapore, Chinese Taipei and Sri Lanka, therefore qualifying for the main division for the first time.

The Volcanoes suffered heavy defeats in the 2013 edition of A5N, however showed good signs with a competitive first half against Hong Kong in Manila, and a win to avoid relegations against UAE also in Manila.

Tournaments

Nickname and emblem

The Philippines national rugby union team is nicknamed the 'Volcanoes'.  The name comes from the 1st Filipino Infantry Regiment that fought under the command of the United States Army.  It was made up of Filipino-Americans with a few Filipino veterans which fought in World War II.  The PRFU thought the situation was similar to the first Philippines national team which mainly consisted of foreign expatriates with only a few Filipinos.

The emblem of the team is based on the insignia of the 1st Filipino Infantry Regiment.  One of its features is a volcano which represents where the infantry units were located.

Players

Current squad
Squad for 2019 Asia Rugby Championship:
Simon Gabion-Sheehan
Harvey Mercado
James Krook
Sam Callaghan
Jeromy Cairns
Sam Bennetts
David Feeney
Ashley Heward
Chris Bird
Edlen Hernandez
Tom Gunn
Kingsley Ballesteros
Ken Mellorin
Tim Berry
Jobel de Castro
Daniel Matthews
Kohei Mitsuhashi
Ellis Rudder
Robert Fogerty
Justin Coveney
Ned Stephenson
Vincent Young
Phillip Hinson
Patricie Olivier
Timothy Bweheni

Notable Rugby players with Filipino heritage
Rod Davies
Marcus Smith
Craig Wing

Coaches
 Mike McMahon (2006)
 Matthew Cullen (2007–2009)
 Expo Mejia (2009–2013)
 Jarred Hodges (2013–)
 Stuart Woodhouse (2013, caretaker)

Honours
Asia Rugby Championship 
Pacific-Asia Regional Champions: 2008
Division 3 Champions: 2009
Division 2 Champions: 2010
Division 1 Champions: 2012, 2018, 2019

Overall record

Their test match record against all nations:

References

External links
 Philippine Rugby Football Union official website
 Philippines at IRB.com
 Manila 10s the social Rugby tournament that has promoted Rugby Union in the Philippines

 
Rugby union in the Philippines
Asian national rugby union teams